{{Automatic taxobox
| fossil_range = Late Permian~
| image = Turfanodon jiufengensis holotype.png
| image_caption = Holotype specimen of T. jiufengensis (IVPP V 26038)
| taxon = Turfanodon
| display_parents= 2
| authority = Sun, 1973
| type_species = Turfanodon bogdaensis
| type_species_authority = Sun, 1973
| subdivision_ranks = Other species
| subdivision =
T. jiufengensis Liu, 2021
| synonyms = 
T. bogdaensis:Dicynodon bogdaensis King, 1988
Dicynodon sunanensis Li, Cheng, and Li, 2000 
Striodon magnus Sun, 1978
}}

 Turfanodon is an extinct genus of dicynodont therapsid from the Late Permian Sunan, Guodikeng, and Naobaogou Formations of China. The holotype of T. bogdaensis was discovered between 1963-1964 and was originally named in 1973 by A. Sun with the type species Turfanodon bogdaensis, Turfanodon was reclassified as a junior synonym of the related Dicynodon in 1988 by G. M. King. T. bogdaensis remained a species of Dicynodon for over two decades before the genus was reinstated in 2011 in a revision of the taxonomy of Dicynodon by palaeontologist Christian Kammerer. A second species from Inner Mongolia, T. jiufengensis, was named in 2021 by palaeontologist Jun Liu from a nearly complete skeleton and other referred bones. Turfanodon was a relatively large dicynodont, and similar in appearance to the related Daptocephalus from South Africa.

References 

Dicynodonts
Anomodont genera
Permian synapsids of Asia
Lopingian genus extinctions
Permian China
Fossils of China
Paleontology in Xinjiang
Fossil taxa described in 1973